In a general sense, presiding officer is synonymous with chairperson.

Politics
Presiding Officer of the National Assembly for Wales, the Speaker of the National Assembly for Wales
Presiding Officer of the Northern Ireland Assembly
Presiding Officer of the Scottish Parliament, the speaker of the Scottish Parliament
Presiding Officer of the United States Senate, the person who presides over the United States Senate
Returning officer, a person responsible for overseeing elections in one or more constituencies
List of current presidents of assembly

Military
Presiding Officer (ARB), is the officer in charge of one of the Administrative Review Boards run by the United States Office for the Administrative Review of Detained Enemy Combatants, at the Guantanamo Bay detention camps, in Cuba
Presiding Officer (Guantanamo Military Commissions), the U.S. officer acting in a judge-like role for Guantanamo Military Commissions

See also
Moderator (disambiguation)
Presiding bishop
Speaker (politics)